Naseem Rafeeq Young, known professionally as 2Rare, is an American rapper and songwriter from Philadelphia. He has been signed to American record executive Mel Carter since October 2022.

Early life 
2Rare was a football player during his high school years. He believed the sport would be "his lane". Originally from Philadelphia, he temporarily moved to Los Angeles due to academic issues and altercations. Later, he eventually returned to Philadelphia where he discovered that his prolonged absence had barred him from returning to class. This led to his separation from football.

Career 
In 2019, he came to light with the release of his single "Big Bag", which landed him a joint venture with record labels 10K Projects, Internet Money Records, and Homemade Projects. In 2020, he began gaining success with the release of his single "Big Drippa".  In January 2022, he released the song "Cupid" and it went viral on TikTok with 21,000,000 streams. In June 2022, he appeared in the music video for Canadian rapper Drake's song "Sticky" and had a dance battle with the latter. In August 2022, he released his song "Q-Pid" with a feature from American rapper Lil Durk. In October 2022, he appeared on American rapper NLE Choppa's single "Do It Again" and in its accompanying music video.

References

External links 
 

Living people
21st-century American rappers
African-American male rappers
Rappers from Philadelphia
Year of birth missing (living people)